Jesse Whitfield Covington (September 16, 1889 – November 21, 1966) was an American sailor serving in the United States Navy during World War I who received the Medal of Honor for bravery.

Biography
Covington was born September 16, 1889, in Haywood County, Tennessee and after enlisting in the United States Navy was sent to France to fight in World War I.  He retired from the Navy in 1935 as a chief petty officer.

He died November 21, 1966, and is buried in Oak Grove Cemetery, Portsmouth, Virginia.

Medal of Honor citation
Rank and organization: Ship's Cook Third Class, U.S. Navy. Entered service at: California. Born: 16 September 1889, Haywood, Tenn. G.O. No.: 403, 1918.

Citation:

For extraordinary heroism following internal explosion of the Florence H. The sea in the vicinity of wreckage was covered by a mass of boxes of smokeless powder, which were repeatedly exploding. Jesse W. Covington, of the U.S.S. Stewart, plunged overboard to rescue a survivor who was surrounded by powder boxes and too exhausted to help himself, fully realizing that similar powder boxes in the vicinity were continually exploding and that he was thereby risking his life in saving the life of this man.

See also

List of Medal of Honor recipients
List of Medal of Honor recipients for World War I

References
Specific

1889 births
1966 deaths
United States Navy Medal of Honor recipients
United States Navy chiefs
United States Navy personnel of World War I
People from Haywood County, Tennessee
World War I recipients of the Medal of Honor
Place of death missing
Military personnel from Tennessee